Björn Cederberg (born July 23, 1937), nicknamed "Kapten" (engl. Captain, due to his rank in the Swedish Army), was a notable Swedish rally co-driver. His most famous and successful partnership was with Stig Blomqvist, in a Saab 99 Turbo, with whom he shared success in a number of international motor rallies, from 1979–1982. Later in 1982, the pair went on to rally the Audi Quattro, with which they were again very successful until 1985.

References

1937 births
Living people
Swedish rally co-drivers
World Rally Championship co-drivers
Swedish Army officers